MCAC may refer to:
 Chesapeake Detention Facility, formerly the Maryland Correctional Adjustment Center
 Manitoba Colleges Athletic Conference in Canada
 McMichael Canadian Art Collection, a art museum in Vaughan, Ontario, Canada
 Merced County Arts Council, art council in California, USA
 Metropolitan Collegiate Athletic Conference, former American college sports conference of the National Collegiate Athletic Association
 Middlesex County Automobile Club, motor club in England
 Midlands Collegiate Athletic Conference, former American college sports conference of the National Association of Intercollegiate Athletics
 Midwest Conference, an NCAA Division III athletic conference known as the Midwest Collegiate Athletic Conference from 1921 to 1994
 Minnesota College Athletic Conference, an American college sports conference of the National Junior College Athletic Association